Fontenelle may refer to:

Places

France
 Fontenelle, Aisne, in the Aisne department
 Fontenelle-en-Brie, in the Aisne department
 Fontenelle, Côte-d'Or, in the Côte-d'Or department
 Fontenelle, Territoire de Belfort, in the Territoire de Belfort department
 Fontenelle-Montby, in the Doubs department

United States
 Fontenelle, Wyoming
 Fontenelle Dam, on the Green River in Wyoming
 Fontenelle Reservoir
 Fontenelle Forest, in Bellevue, Nebraska
 Fontenelle Park, a public park in North Omaha, Nebraska
 Fontenelle's Post, in Nebraska Territory
 Hotel Fontenelle, a demolished hotel in Omaha, Nebraska
 Logan Fontenelle Housing Project, Omaha, Nebraska
 Logan Fontenelle Middle School, Bellevue, Nebraska

Other places
 Fontenelle (crater), a crater on the Moon

People
 Bernard Le Bovier de Fontenelle (1657–1757), French writer
 Guy Éder de La Fontenelle (1573–1602), house of Beaumanoir, Catholic League partisan, bandit in western Brittany
 Desiderius of Fontenelle (died 700), Frankish saint of the late 7th century
 Logan Fontenelle (1825–1855), chief of the Omaha Tribe
 Louisa Fontenelle (1769–1799), actress and singer who played in London and Scotland, then joined the Boston Theatre
 Lucien Fontenelle (1800–1840), prominent fur trader in the Nebraska area

See also
 Fontanella (disambiguation)
 Fontanelle (disambiguation)
 Fontenelle Abbey (disambiguation)
 La Fontenelle (disambiguation)